Rosario "Ross" Romano  (born 1979) is a Canadian politician who serves as Chief Government Whip in the Legislative Assembly of Ontario. A member of the Progressive Conservative (PC) Party, Romano has held a number of portfolios since the PCs formed government in 2018, including as minister of government and consumer services, and minister of colleges and universities. He represents the riding of Sault Ste. Marie.

Political career 
He was first elected in a by-election on June 1, 2017 and became the first Conservative to represent the district in 32 years. A lawyer by profession, Romano began his political career upon being elected to the Sault Ste. Marie City Council in 2014. Romano was re-elected on June 7, 2018.

Electoral record

References

Living people
Members of the Executive Council of Ontario
Progressive Conservative Party of Ontario MPPs
21st-century Canadian politicians
Canadian people of Italian descent
Sault Ste. Marie, Ontario city councillors
Lawyers in Ontario
1979 births